The siege of Balkh can refer to one of these historical events:

 Siege of Balkh (1370), by Timur
 Siege of Balkh (1447), during the Timurid Civil Wars